York Region, located in southcentral Ontario, Canada, assigned approximately 50 regional roads, each with a number ranging from 1 to 99. All expenses of York Regional Roads (for example, snow shovelling, road repairs, traffic lights) are funded by the York Region government. Several new roads were assumed by the region include King–Vaughan Town Line and Kirby Sideroad. Most north-south roads originating in Toronto retains the proper names from south of Steeles Avenue.

Roads on Georgina Island are maintained by Chippewas of Georgina Island First Nation despite the island being within York Region.

Roads are generally paved with some gravel roads in less populated areas. Before the 20th Century most cleared roads were dirt roads.

Types of roads

King's Highways 

As in the rest of Ontario, the provincially maintained highways in York Region are designated with a shield-shaped sign topped with a crown. The highway number is in the centre, with the name ONTARIO below. These signs are known as shields.

Provincially maintained highways generally have greater construction standards than municipally or locally maintained roads. Although they are usually one lane in either direction, several short sections with two lanes in one direction as a passing lane exist along the highways.

York Region is also home to three 400-series highways, which are controlled-access freeways.

Toll highway 
York Region is home to a privately-maintained (but provincially-owned) toll freeway, the 407 ETR. The freeway crosses the Region east-west near the southern border. Toll rates vary depending on the section, time of day, and mileage driven.

Regional Roads 
York Regional Roads are signed with a flowerpot-shaped sign, as are most regional and county roads in Ontario. The road number appears in the centre of the sign, with the word REGION above and the word YORK below. Like King's Highways, these signs are known as shields. As par standard practice in regional municipalities, they run through and are signed in urban areas in addition to rural areas.

King's Highways 
The following is a list of provincially maintained highways in York Region. Communities are ordered by where the route encounters them (either from south to north or from west to east).

Privately owned freeway

Georgina Island

The main arterial road is a series of different named roads:

 Bear Road - runs along south side of Georgina Island
 Chief Joseph Snake Road - runs along western side of Georgina Island and transitions  to Loon Road at northern tip
 Loon Road - runs along eastern side of Georgina Island and transitions to Chief Joseph Snake Road at northern tip

Boundaries of York Region
Steeles Avenue marks the York Region/Toronto boundary, internally designated as York Regional Road 95
York–Durham Regional Road 30 (York–Durham Line), York Regional Road 32 (Ravenshoe Road), and Durham Region Road 23 (Lake Ridge Road) marks the York Region/Durham Region boundary
York Regional Road 24 (or Peel Regional Road 50) marks the York Region/Peel Region boundary
Highway 9 and Holland River form the York Region/Simcoe County boundary

Georgina Island, Fox Island and Snake Island are within York Region, but are also part of the Chippewas of Georgina Island First Nation.

Regional Roads

References

MapArt Golden Horseshoe atlas Pages 300-399

 
York Region